Phaeoramularia manihotis is a fungal plant pathogen infecting cassava.

References

External links 
Index Fungorum
USDA ARS Fungal Database

Fungal plant pathogens and diseases
Root vegetable diseases
Mycosphaerellaceae
Fungi described in 1976